The United Irishman/An tÉireannach Aontaithe, first published in May 1948, under Michael Traynor, was the official monthly organ of Sinn Féin sold by its members. After the split in the Irish Republican Movement, the title continued as the organ of Official Sinn Féin, being published from the offices in 30 Gardner Place in Dublin, with the Provisional wing publishing An Phoblacht. The first editor was Seán G. O'Kelly based in an office in 38 South King Street in Dublin. The historian Éamonn MacThomáis edited the paper for a short while prior to the 1970 split in Sinn Féin. Other editors of the paper included Seán Cronin, Seán Ó Brádaigh (1958–1960), Ruairí Ó Brádaigh, Eoin Ó Murchú, Jackie Ward, Seamus Ó Tuathail, Denis Foley and Tony Meade (1967). Contributors to the paper included Eamon McCann, Roy Johnston, Eamon Smullen, Eoghan Harris and Sean Garland. The United Irishman was replaced with The Irish People and the Workers' Weekly in 1980.

It opposed the Republic of Ireland's entry into the European Economic Community

References

Further reading
About us, An Phoblacht – a history of republican newspapers including United Irishman.

1980 disestablishments in Ireland
Defunct newspapers published in Ireland
Irish republican newspapers
Publications established in 1948
Sinn Féin
Workers' Party (Ireland)